Francis Leblanc, known professionally as Fridayy, is an American rapper from Philadelphia, Pennsylvania, who is currently signed to Def Jam Recordings. He is known for appearing on the song "Forever" by Lil Baby and the title track of DJ Khaled's album God Did, which respectively peaked at numbers eight and 17 on the Billboard Hot 100; the latter garnered him three Grammy Award nominations.

Early life
Leblanc started playing instruments like the piano, the bass, and the guitar at the age of 6. His father is a pastor and he credits his passion for music to his days in the church sanctuary. Leblanc is of Haitian decent which he mentions on his Twitter account and the remix of his song "Blessings".

Career
In 2014, Fridayy created his first track alongside his cousin Leo. In June 2022, he landed production credits on Chris Brown's album Breezy. In October 2022, Fridayy's debut single "Don't Give Up On Me" was made available. Also in October 2022, he appeared on Lil Baby's album It's Only Me on the track "Forever", which peaked at number eight on the Billboard Hot 100. Again in October 2022, his debut EP Lost in Melody became available with a sole guest appearance from Vory. In November 2022, Fridayy received three Grammy Award nominations as a featured artist on DJ Khaled's song "God Did" for the 65th Annual Grammy Awards in 2023.

Discography

Extended plays

Other charted songs

Guest appearances

Production discography

2022 
Rae Sremmurd
 "Denial" 

Chris Brown – Breezy
1. "Till the Wheels Fall Off" (featuring Lil Durk and Capella Grey) 

Wiz Khalifa – Multiverse
4. "1000 Women" (featuring They) 

DJ Khaled – God Did
2. "God Did" (featuring Rick Ross, Lil Wayne, Jay-Z, John Legend and Fridayy) 

Lil Baby – It's Only Me
8. "Forever" (featuring Fridayy)  
9. "Blessings (Remix)" (featuring Asake)

Fridayy – Lost in Melody
1. "Blessings" 
2. "Empty Stomach" 
3. "God Sent" (featuring Vory) 
4. "Dont Give Up on Me" 
5. "Know the Truth" 
6. "Come Through" 
7. "Momma"

Awards and nominations

References

External links 
 

Living people
21st-century American rappers
21st-century American male singers
21st-century American singers
American contemporary R&B singers
American hip hop record producers
American hip hop singers
American male rappers
American male singer-songwriters
Def Jam Recordings artists
Rappers from Philadelphia
Record producers from Pennsylvania
Singer-songwriters from Pennsylvania
Year of birth missing (living people)